The following is a timeline of the history of the city of Cremona in the Lombardy region of Italy.

Prior to 16th century

 218 BCE - Cremona becomes part of the Roman Republic.
 89 BCE - Roman citizenship granted to Cremonese.

 69 CE -  occurs during the Roman civil war (68-69).
 450 CE - Roman Catholic Diocese of Cremona established (approximate date).
 550 CE - Byzantines in power; town called "Cataulada."
 603 CE - Town sacked by Lombard forces of Agilulf.
 774 - Franks in power in region.
 962 - Liutprand of Cremona becomes bishop.
 1022 - Ruler Landolfo ousted.
 1098 - Commune established.
 1116 - Office of consul active (approximate date).
 1167
 Cremona joins the Lombard League.
 Cremona Baptistery built.
 1190 - Cremona Cathedral consecrated.
 1250 - Parma-Cremona conflict.
 1291 - Torrazzo of Cremona (tower) built.
 1311 - Cremona sacked by forces of Henry VII, Holy Roman Emperor.
 1322 - Galeazzo I Visconti in power.
 1406 -  in power.
 1419 - Filippo Maria Visconti in power.
 1473 - Printing press in operation.
 1499 - Venetians in power.

16th-19th centuries
 1505 - Future luthier Andrea Amati born in Cremona.
 1512 - Maximilian Sforza in power.
 1535 - Spaniards in power in Lombardy region.
 1565 -  (administrative region) formed.
 1567 - Future composer Claudio Monteverdi born in Cremona.
 1588 - Astronomical clock installed in the Torrazzo.
 1644 - Future luthier Antonio Stradivari born in Cremona.
 1668 - Population: 10,000.
 1676 - Accademia dei Disuniti formed.
 1702 - Battle of Cremona fought during the War of the Spanish Succession.
 1707 - Austrians in power.
 1747 - Teatro Nazari (theatre) opens.
 1775 -  opens.
 1814 - Austrians in power in Lombardy region.
 1848 - Revolution of 1848.
 1859
 Cremona becomes part of the Kingdom of Italy.
  (provincial district) established.
 1863 - Treviglio–Cremona railway begins operating & Cremona railway station opens.
 1866 - Pavia–Cremona railway and Brescia–Cremona railway begin operating.
 1875 - Interessi Cremonesi newspaper begins publication.
 1879 - Provincia newspaper begins publication.
 1897 - Population: 37,632.

20th century
 1901 - Population: 39,344.
 1903 - U.S. Cremonese (football club) formed.
 1906 - Cremona–Fidenza railway begins operating.
 1911 - Population: 40,436.
 1916 -  begins operating.
 1922 - "Fascist squads devastated the headquarters" of the Italian People's Party in Cremona.
 1928 - Museo Civico Ala Ponzone (museum) opens in the Palazzo .
 1929 - Stadio Giovanni Zini (stadium) opens.
 1933 - Piacenza–Cremona railway begins operating.
 1940 -  begins operating.
 1947 - La Provincia di Cremona newspaper begins publication.
 1971 - Population: 82,904.(it)
 1994 -  (library) established.

21st century

 2012 - UNESCO recognized the "Traditional violin craftsmanship in Cremona" as intangible cultural heritage
 2013 - Population: 72,137.
 2014 - Gianluca Galimberti becomes mayor.
2019 - The Museo del Violino commences the "Stradivarius Sound Bank" preservation project.

See also
 Cremona history (it) 
 List of mayors of Cremona
 List of bishops of Cremona (in Italian)
 Lombardy history (region)
  (region)

Timelines of other cities in the macroregion of Northwest Italy:(it)
 Liguria region: Timeline of Genoa 
 Lombardy region: Timeline of Bergamo; Brescia; Mantua; Milan; Pavia
 Piedmont region: Timeline of Novara; Turin

References

This article incorporates information from the Italian Wikipedia.

Bibliography

in English
 
 
 
 
 

  (+ 1870 ed.)

in Italian
 
 
  (bibliography)

External links

 Archivio di Stato di Cremona (state archives)
 Items related to Cremona, various dates (via Europeana)
 Items related to Cremona, various dates (via Digital Public Library of America)

Cremona
Cremona
cremona